George Washington Rightmire (November 15, 1868 – December 23, 1952), born in Lawrence County, Ohio, was the sixth President of Ohio State University.  He graduated from Ohio State in 1895 and taught in the Columbus Public Schools for seven years.  From 1904 to 1919 he studied and practiced intellectual property law in Columbus, Ohio.  He was an instructor and professor, before becoming the dean of the College of Law at Ohio State University. In 1925, he served as the acting president of the university for about four months.  He eventually took the presidential office in 1926.  Rightmire Hall, a science laboratory at Ohio State, is named in his honor.

George Rightmire was the Ohio State University President from March 1, 1926 to July 1, 1938.

Further reading
Past Presidents of the Ohio State University
Rightmire Hall at Ohio State University

Presidents of Ohio State University
People from Lawrence County, Ohio
1868 births
1952 deaths